The Pakistan men's national under-18 basketball team is a national basketball team of Pakistan, governed by the Pakistan Basketball Federation.
It represents the country in international under-18 (under age 18) basketball competitions.

See also
Pakistan men's national basketball team
Pakistan men's national 3x3 team

References

Basketball teams in Pakistan
Men's national under-18 basketball teams
Basketball